Brazilian Wrestling Federation (BWF) is a Brazilian professional wrestling association, the largest in the country. The federation holds one internet show, the BWF Telecatch. The company was founded with the mission to revive the popularity of Pro Wrestling and Telecatch in Brazil.

History

The BWF was founded in 2002 by Bob Junior. The first televised match was in 2009 and concerts were also broadcast via the official site and YouTube channel.

The company was the first Brazilian wrestling promotion to reportedly support a wrestler to compete outside the country. Female wrestler Bia fought under the name Bianca in a match at Combat Zone Wrestling (CZW) in 2003 alongside Sabian, fighting Joker and Mercedez Martinez.

In 2012, BWF became a stage of the “Torneio Sul-Americano de Luta Livre” (South American Wrestling Tournament) and in its first year brought international wrestlers like Super Crazy and Zumbi to Brazil.

Since 2013, BWF has been more visible in the media. That year the company announced the participation of KENTA, Eddie Edwards, Naomichi Marufuji, Taiji Ishimori and other international wrestlers for the "Torneio Latino Americano de Luta Livre" (Latin American Wrestling Tournament).

On April 27, 2014 BWF debuted a special event called "Convocado Para Lutar" (Called to Fight) that was attended by William Regal and Director of Development Canyon Ceman as part of the assessment of BWF wrestlers for a tryout in WWE.

BWF was present at an anime convention in 2014 and announced the debut of BWF Rookies, a developmental division whose group of young talents would form the "new wrestlers" division.

In 2015, a new tournament called "Backyard Arena" was presented, and bring some Brazilian independent wrestlers to fight for a BWF contract. The winner of tournament was Death Rider. 

In 2015 Cezar Bononi, which competed under the ring name of V8 Big Block and held the BWF Rei Do Ringue Championship once, was recruited into WWE NXT and debuted in 2017 against Aleister Black.

In 2019, BWF partnered with MMA promotion SFT to transmit their programming in Rede Bandeirantes, having now national reach.

Championships and accomplishments

Roster

References

2002 establishments in Brazil
Professional wrestling in Brazil
Professional wrestling promotions